Beckfield College is a private for-profit college in Florence, Kentucky. It was founded in 1984 by Harry L. Beck.

History 
The college was founded in 1984 by Harry L. Beck under the name "Educational Services Center".

References 

1984 establishments in Ohio
Educational institutions established in 1984
Private universities and colleges in Kentucky
Private universities and colleges in Ohio
Education in Hamilton County, Ohio
Florence, Kentucky
Education in Boone County, Kentucky
For-profit universities and colleges in the United States